Hlinsko is a town in Chrudim District in the Pardubice Region of the Czech Republic. It has about 9,400 inhabitants. It is the natural centre of a microregion called Hlinecko. The local part of Betlém is well preserved example of folk architecture and is protected by law as a village monument reservation.

Administrative parts

Town parts and villages of Blatno, Čertovina, Chlum, Kouty and Srní are administrative parts of Hlinsko. Chlum forms an exclave of the municipal territory.

Etymology
The name is derived from hlína, i.e. "clay".

Geography
It is situated on both banks of the Chrudimka River. It lies in the Iron Mountains and partly in the eponymous protected landscape area.

History
The area around the Chrudimka River is inhabited since the 12th century. Hlinsko was founded in the 12th century as a guarding settlement on the trade route from Bohemia to Moravia. The first written mention of Hlinsko is from 1349. The fortress in Hlinsko is first documented in 1413. In the 16th century, it served as a royal customhouse.

During the reign of Maria Theresa, Hlinsko became a market town, and in 1834, it became a town. During its history, the town's economy consisted mainly of agriculture, pottery, wire-making and weaving. In 1871, the railway was built and the town was industrialized.

Demographics

Economy
There is a major dairy company Mlékárna Hlinsko in the town. The company was founded in 1939, and the production started in 1943.

Culture
Hlinsko and several municipalities in the surrounding area are known for Slavic carnival processions of masks. In 2010, this tradition known as "Shrovetide door-to-door processions and masks in the villages of the Hlinecko area" was included on the UNESCO Intangible Cultural Heritage Lists.

Sights

Hlinsko is known for the Betlém Village Monument Reservation with preserved examples of folk architecture. This area around the Chrudimka River consists of valuable timbered and brick houses from the 18th and early 19th centuries. It is part of the Vysočina Open Air Museum.

The historic centre is formed by Poděbradovo Square. The most valuable building are the town hall, Ježdík's House and the old fortress. The town hall was built in 1598 and was rebuilt in the Baroque style in 1788–1792. The last reconstructions were made in 1850. Since its foundation, it serves its original purpose. Ježdík's House is a significant house with sgraffito decorations from 1904. The old fortress, called just The Fortress, is the oldest building in Hlinsko.

The Church of the Nativity of the Virgin Mary is located outside the historic centre. The originally Gothic church was rebuilt in the Baroque style in 1730–1745, but the Gothic tower was preserved. It has a valuable baptistry from 1628.

Notable people
Emanuel Famíra (1900–1970), sculptor
Karel Lidický (1900–1976), sculptor
Jan Vokál (born 1958), bishop
Jan Chvojka (born 1980), politician

Twin towns – sister cities

Hlinsko is twinned with:
 Púchov, Slovakia
 Stara Pazova, Serbia

References

External links

Cities and towns in the Czech Republic
Populated places in Chrudim District